Keith Gemmell (15 February 1948 – 24 July 2016) was a British musician. He played saxophone, clarinet, and flute, and was best known for being a member of art rock band Audience from 1969 to 1972 and from 2004 to 2016. He was also a musical arranger and composer, published digital sheet music, wrote articles for the UK publication Music Tech Magazine, and was the author of several books including the best-seller Cubase Tips & Tricks.

Early life and career
Keith Gemmell was born in Hackney, London. He started playing the recorder at the age of 13 and was later attracted to the clarinet on hearing Acker Bilk's "Stranger on the Shore". He has cited his early influences as the British trad jazz bands of the day, Acker Bilk, Kenny Ball and Chris Barber being the best known names. Upon hearing such bands as Georgie Fame and the Blue Flames, Sounds Incorporated and The Mar-Keys he decided to take up the saxophone and began playing in local bands. Aged 17, he turned fully professional, joining Bognor Regis based band The Noblemen and between August 1965 and May 1966, toured Europe playing in clubs, US bases and the Piper Club in Rome. On returning to the UK he joined Hackney band, The Lloyd Alexander Blues Band, who later metamorphosed into Audience.

Performing and recording career
Formed in 1969, Audience had an unusual line up of tenor sax doubling clarinet and flute, electric acoustic guitar, drums and bass. They had no lead guitarist as such and with the aid of echo loops and wah-wah pedal Gemmell's reeds replaced this traditional rock band role.

After Audience, in 1972, Gemmell joined forces with Mick Underwood, Geoff Sharkey, Paul Simmons and Mick Hodgkinson to form Sammy. Their one and only album was produced by Ian Gillan (Deep Purple).

Upon the breakup of Sammy, Gemmell joined the Roy Young Band. He now found himself playing alongside his teenage hero, Eddie Thornton (former trumpet player with Georgie Fame and the Blue Flames). He became friendly with Eddie and together they played many reggae sessions, along with the legendary Jamaican trombonist, Rico Rodriguez.

After a call from their management, Gemmell left the Roy Young Band for a three-year stint with West Country band, Stackridge, a popular live act in the early to mid 1970s. Like Audience, Stackridge were a unique band with an unusual line up and quirky but catchy songs. He played on their albums, Extravaganza, Pinafore Days (US only) and 1976's Mr. Mick.

When Stackridge collapsed he left the world of rock bands behind him, studying clarinet with Prof. Richard Addison (principal clarinetist with the Royal Philharmonic Orchestra) for a year. Now living in London, Gemmell joined several big bands, played sessions, played in function bands, on the QE2, taught for ILEA and enjoyed a successful freelance career. He also did a great deal of copying (music preparation) for film composer, John Altman, which kindled his interest in writing and arranging music.

Following the session work, Gemmell joined the Pasadena Roof Orchestra taking the 2nd. alto sax and clarinet chair. They toured extensively and he remained with them for 14 years, (1983–1997). In that time, he wrote many arrangements for the orchestra.

Later life and work
Upon leaving the PRO, Gemmell built a second freelance career, this time as a writer of both words (music technology) and music (composing and arranging). His first book, Get Creative with Cubase, was about recording with Cubase, firstly from a musician's perspective, secondly, from an engineer's perspective. Other music technology books followed and in 2003 he began contributing articles to Music Tech magazine.

In 2004 Audience reformed, and continued to tour and record until 2013.

Keith Gemmell died from tongue cancer on 24 July 2016, at age 68.

Selected discography
with Audience
 1969 Audience
 1970 Friend's Friend's Friend
 1971 The House on the Hill
 1972 Lunch
 2006 Alive & Kickin' & Screamin' & Shoutin'

with Sammy
 1972 Sammy
with Stackridge 1974 Extravaganza 1974 Pinafore Days (US only)
 1976 Mr. Mickwith Pasadena Roof Orchestra
sessions
 1979 The Innes Book of Records 1976 Man from Wareika 1982 Off the Recordfilm soundtracks
 1969 Bronco BullfrogBibliographyCubase 5 Tips and TricksCubase 4 Tips and TricksGarageBand Tips and TricksKeep it Simple with GarageBandMaking Music on the Apple MacCubase SX/SL Tips and TricksGet Creative With Emagic LogicGet Creative With Cubase VST''

All published by PC Publishing.

References

1948 births
2016 deaths
People from Hackney Central
English rock saxophonists
Stackridge members
20th-century saxophonists